The Star Entertainment Group Limited is an Australian gambling and entertainment company. The company was formerly known as Echo Entertainment.

Properties
The Star Entertainment owns and operates the Treasury Casino & Hotel, The Star Gold Coast and The Star, Sydney.  Star Entertainment holds two out of Queensland's four casino operation licenses.

The group also manages the Gold Coast Convention & Exhibition Centre on behalf of the Queensland Government. Star owns a 50% stake in the Sheraton Mirage resort on the Southport Spit.

Queen's Wharf Brisbane

The Queensland Government announced on 20 July 2015 that Echo Entertainment as 50% joint venture partner of the Destination Brisbane Consortium was the preferred tenderer for Queen's Wharf, Brisbane, beating rival Crown Resorts. Echo has two Hong-Kong based joint venture partners Chow Tai Fook Enterprises and Far East Consortium. The two joint venture partners will each contribute 25% of the capital to develop the integrated resort and will also jointly pay for the apartment and broader Queen's Wharf developments.

Controversy 
In 2021 a joint report by the Sydney Morning Herald the Age, and the television program 60 Minutes, found that Star management had been warned that it's anti-money laundering controls were inadequate and that between 2014 and 2021 Star had attempted to recruit high rollers who were allegedly linked to criminal or foreign-influence activities. In response to the report Star stated that it was " "concerned by a number of assertions within the media reports that it considers misleading." And also stated that it would take steps to address the allegations with Australian authorities. Following the report shareholders began forming a class action lawsuit against Star and inquiries were launched by Queensland's, Western Australia's, Victoria's, and New South Wales's state gaming regulators. 

On 13 September 2022 the NSW Independent Casino Commission (NICC) published a report finding The Star unsuitable to hold its Sydney casino license because of its conduct relating to money laundering risks. It had 14 days to respond. The company was fined A$100m ($62m) as a result. Star's gambling license was suspended and operations at Pyrmont were placed under a new manager Nicholas Weeks.

In late 2022, the Queensland Government also found Star unsuitable to hold its dual state casino licences. Former Court of Appeal Judge Robert Gotterson conducted an independent review of the matter.  Queensland Attorney-General Shannon Fentiman found Star misled regulators and failed in its anti-money laundering duties. The company has been served a statement of claim for a securities class action in the Supreme Court of Victoria. The class action alleges   that Star breached disclosure obligations and acted against the best interests of the shareholders. Star was fined $100 million on 9 December 2022. Casino licences for the Treasury Brisbane and the Star Gold Coast will be suspended for 90 days, with this action deferred until December 1, 2023. The deferment gives Star an opportunity to remediate its management and operations.

See also

List of companies of Australia

References

External links

 

 
Gambling companies of Australia
Holding companies of Australia
Entertainment companies established in 2011
Holding companies established in 2011
Australian companies established in 2011
Gambling companies established in 2011
Companies listed on the Australian Securities Exchange
Companies based in Brisbane